Neonitocris is a genus of longhorn beetles of the subfamily Lamiinae, containing the following species:

 Neonitocris alzanoi Breuning, 1950
 Neonitocris atra (Jordan, 1894)
 Neonitocris bourgeati Breuning & Téocchi, 1978
 Neonitocris calva (Thomson, 1868)
 Neonitocris ealensis Breuning, 1950
 Neonitocris emarginata (Chevrolat, 1858)
 Neonitocris eulitopoides Lepesme, 1947
 Neonitocris flavipes Breuning, 1950
 Neonitocris gaboniensis Breuning, 1956
 Neonitocris hiekei Breuning, 1965
 Neonitocris infrarufa Breuning, 1956
 Neonitocris leonis (Jordan, 1894) 
 Neonitocris mangenoti Lepesme & Breuning, 1953
 Neonitocris modesta (Fabricius, 1781)
 Neonitocris nigriceps Breuning, 1957
 Neonitocris nigripes (Kolbe, 1893)
 Neonitocris orientalis Breuning, 1956
 Neonitocris plicata (Hintz, 1919)
 Neonitocris postscutellaris Lepesme & Breuning, 1951
 Neonitocris princeps (Jordan, 1894)
 Neonitocris regina (Jordan, 1894)
 Neonitocris rubricollis Téocchi & Sudre, 2003
 Neonitocris rubriventris (Hintz, 1919)
 Neonitocris rufipes Breuning, 1950
 Neonitocris servilis (Jordan, 1894)
 Neonitocris sibutensis Breuning, 1956
 Neonitocris spiniscapus Breuning, 1956
 Neonitocris thoracica (Jordan, 1894)

References